Matar Al Harthi (born 1948) is a Saudi Arabian sport shooter. He competed in the 1988 Summer Olympics.

References

1948 births
Living people
Shooters at the 1988 Summer Olympics
Saudi Arabian male sport shooters
Olympic shooters of Saudi Arabia